Vatica pentandra is a species of plant in the family Dipterocarpaceae. It is a tree endemic to Borneo. It is a critically endangered species threatened by habitat loss.

References

pentandra
Endemic flora of Borneo
Trees of Borneo
Flora of Kalimantan
Taxonomy articles created by Polbot